Lucas Arnau (born May 16, 1979 in Medellín, Antioquia), is a Colombian singer-songwriter. 

Arnau's first album, "Un Poco Más" was produced by Jose Gaviria and Andres Munera in Miami, Florida and was released in Latin America in April 2004.

His second album, "Rompecabezas" was launched in August 2006 and has been very well welcomed by his fans in Colombia, and Latin America. The album was produced by Grammy and Latin Grammy award-winning songwriter/producer Luis F. Ochoa in Miami, Florida and co-produced by Lucas Arnau and David Cardenas.

Both albums have been a smash hit in Latin America, especially in Colombia, Perú, and Ecuador.

Lucas Arnau was awarded Shock Magazine's Best Colombian Pop Artist on September 21, 2007

Early life 
Lucas Arnau's musical curiosity started at a very young age inspired by his father's singing and songwriting. His Mother, a creative director for an Advertising Agency in Colombia, was also an important influence in Arnau's artistic interests. Lucas wrote his first song at age 11 and was able to sing it at the age of 23.

Awards and nominations

Latin Grammy Awards
A Latin Grammy Award is an accolade by the Latin Academy of Recording Arts & Sciences to recognize outstanding achievement in the music industry.

|-
| style="text-align:center;" rowspan="1"| 2015 ||Buen Camino || Best Contemporary Tropical Album || 
|-
| style="text-align:center;" rowspan="1"| 2017 ||Teatro || Best Contemporary Tropical Album || 
|-

External links 
 Official Site

References 

1979 births
Living people
Colombian singer-songwriters
Colombian pop singers
21st-century Colombian male singers
Tropipop musicians
Musicians from Medellín